The Slovak National Archives were created in 1928. They are under the authority of the Minister of the Interior. They are located in Bratislava, Slovakia.

See also
 List of national archives

External links
 Slovak National Archives

National archives
Slovak culture
Archives in Slovakia